The Mohegan are an ethnic group of Connecticut, United States.

Mohegan may also refer to:
Mohegan Tribe, the federally recognized tribe of the Mohegan people
Mohegan language, an Algonquian language
SS Mohegan, a steamship wrecked off the coast of Cornwall, United Kingdom
Mohegan, West Virginia, an unincorporated community in West Virginia, United States
Lake Mohegan, New York, a census-designated place in Westchester County, New York, United States
Mohegan Lake (Hamilton County, New York), a lake in New York, United States
Mohegan Hill, an elevation in Otsego County, New York, United States

See also

Mahegan
Mohican (disambiguation)